Thomas Howard Page (28 May 1872 – 7 December 1953) was an English first-class cricketer.

Page made his first-class debut for Hampshire in the 1900 County Championship against Essex. On debut Page took 4 wickets for 115 runs and scored an unbeaten 61. Page's final first-class appearance for Hampshire came in the same season against Surrey.

Page died in Swanage, Dorset on 7 December 1953.

External links
Thomas Page at Cricinfo
Thomas Page at CricketArchive

1872 births
1953 deaths
Sportspeople from Dover, Kent
English cricketers
Hampshire cricketers